Robbie Lee Burns (born 14 November 1990) is an English professional footballer who plays as a midfielder for Hitchin Town.

Career
Burns, who was born in Milton Keynes, started his career at Leicester City where he was a product of their youth academy after joining the club at the age or 12. He signed his first professional contract with the club on 20 March 2009, signing a one-year deal.

On the same day he joined Tranmere Rovers on loan for the rest of the 2008–09 season. He made his debut for Tranmere on 25 April, coming off the bench as a 76th-minute substitute in their 3–1 defeat against Leeds United replacing Edrissa Sonko. He made his second appearance a week later in Tranmere's 1–1 against Yeovil Town replacing Charlie Barnett.

On 17 May 2010, Burns was released by Leicester along with Stephen Clemence, Levi Porter, Billy Kee, Carl Pentney, Astrit Ajdarevic and Alex Cisak.

He was given a trial with Ipswich Town in the 2010 pre-season campaign. He played and scored in Ipswich's friendly against Leiston. He signed for Conference North side Nuneaton Town in September 2010.

Career statistics
Correct as of 12 August 2009

NOTE: teams in Italics indicate loan period

References

External links

1990 births
Living people
People from Milton Keynes
English footballers
Association football midfielders
Leicester City F.C. players
Tranmere Rovers F.C. players
Nuneaton Borough F.C. players
Hitchin Town F.C. players
English Football League players
Footballers from Buckinghamshire